Ophisma pallescens is a moth of the family Noctuidae first described by Francis Walker in 1864. It is found in Thailand, Peninsular Malaysia, Sumatra, Borneo, Sulawesi, Seram and New Guinea.

References

External links

Ophiusina